Christiane is a given name, a form of the Latin Christiana, feminine form of Christianuis (see Christian), or a Latinized form of Middle English Christin 'Christian' (Old English christen, from Latin). 

A short form is Chris. Alternate spellings are Christianne, Cristiane and Kristiane.

People with the name Christiane
Christiane Amanpour (born 1958), British-Iranian journalist 
Christiane Bøcher (1798-1874), Norwegian actress
Christiane Brunner (born 1947), Swiss politician and advocate
Christiane Chabot (born 1950), French-Canadian artist
Christiane Collange (born 1930), French journalist
Christiane Duchesne (born 1949), Canadian researcher, educator, illustrator, translator and writer
Christiane Eda-Pierre (1932–2020), French soprano
Christiane Felscherinow, German actress, and subject of the 1981 film Christiane F
Christiane von Goethe (1765–1816), wife of Johann Wolfgang von Goethe
Christiane Herzog (1936–2000), wife of German president Roman Herzog
Christiane Hörbiger (b. 1938), Austrian actress 
Christiane Leenaerts (1905–1984), known as Ann Christy, Belgian singer
Christiane Legrand (1930–2011), French singer
Christiane Northrup (born 1949), Obstetrician-gynecologist who promotes anti vaccine and medical pseudoscience
Christiane Nüsslein-Volhard (b. 1942), German biologist
Christiane Paul (b. 1974), German actress
Christiane Rousseau, French mathematician 
Cristiane (footballer) (b. 1985), Brazilian football player

People with the name Christianne
Christianne Balk (born 1953), American poet
Christianne Gout (born 1973), Mexican dancer
Christianne Meneses Jacobs (born 1971), Nicaraguan writer
Christianne Klein, American news anchor
Christianne Legentil (born 1992), Mauritian judoka 
Christianne Mwasesa (born 1985), Democratic Republic of the Congo handball player
Christianne Oliveira (born 1981), Brazilian actress
Christianne van der Wal (born 1973), Dutch politician

Fictional characters
Christiane Barkhorn, from the media franchise Strike Witches
Christiane Friedrich, from the visual novel Maji de Watashi ni Koi Shinasai!

See also
 Christian (given name)
 Christina (given name)

References 

Latin feminine given names
English-language feminine given names
Feminine given names